Khwaja Nizamuddin Bhuiyan was a Bangladeshi officer in the Gonobahini, who was killed fighting in the Bangladesh Liberation war. He was awarded Bir Uttam, the second highest military award in Bangladesh. He won the Independence Award in 2023 for his contribution to the field of Independence and Liberation War.

Early life
Bhuiyan was born in Malapara, Comilla, East Pakistan, Pakistan on 19 February 1949. He graduated from G. M Sen Institute in 1964 and from Comilla Victoria College in 1966. He finished his undergraduate and graduates studies in Communication from University of Dhaka in 1969 and 1970 respectively.

Career
Bhuyan joined InterContinental Dhaka as a controller of accounts. After the start of Bangladesh Liberation war on 25 March 1971, he decided to join the war effort in April. He went to Indranagar, Agartala, India to receive military training. He joined the Gonobahini and was appointed Captain of Sector 4. He fought a number of guerrilla battles in Sylhet district with the Pakistan Army.

Death and legacy
Bhuyan had a direct confrontation with the Pakistan Army in Atgram Road, Kanaighat on 4 September 1971. He was killed in the fighting. The Government of Bangladesh awarded him gallantry award of 'Bir Uttam' posthumously. The Mokimtila Road market was named Nizam Nagar after him. Shaheed Khwaja Nizamuddin Bir Uttam Sarak in Comilla was named after him. Bir Uttam Shaheed Khwaja Nizamuddin Bhuyan road was named after him in Dhaka.

References

1949 births
1971 deaths
People killed in the Bangladesh Liberation War
People from Comilla District
Bangladesh Army officers
University of Dhaka alumni
Recipients of the Bir Uttom
Mukti Bahini personnel
Recipients of the Independence Day Award